Jerger is a surname. Notable people with the surname include:

Alfred Jerger (1889–1976), Austrian opera singer, conductor, and professor
Anton Jerger, Austrian philatelist
Natalie Enright Jerger, American computer scientist

References

See also
Berger
German patronymic surnames

Surnames from given names